is an anime series which consists of 13 episodes that began airing in Japan October 2, 2005. The original story was by Hiroyuki Kawasaki. It was directed by Tsutomu Yabuki and produced by Studio Hibari and Trinet Entertainment.

Overview
The protagonist of the series, Amano Sakogami, is a happy but unlucky girl. She has a dream about being attacked by a woman in a purple kimono. She is rescued by a boy in this dream, who causes her to forget the dream. It is only when she is recruited by a club at her school that she remembers. This club is called the Kaiun Kenkyukai (Better Fortune Research Organization), a cover for the Happy Seven, seven girls who each have a different power of the Shichifukujin, the Seven Lucky Gods. There are two other female members of the club, a dog-girl and a girl with pigtails and glasses. Amano recognizes the lone male member of the club as the boy who rescued her in her dreams. When she realizes this, she appoints herself their manager, hoping that this will allow her to get closer to him. She realizes that the student council president is Happy Seven's adversary, working with the woman in the purple kimono she saw in her dream. He is one of the reasons that Magatsugami, monsters that feed on negative emotions, are being released onto the world. It is the Happy Seven's job to fight them and find people with incredibly bad luck (such as Amano) and help them improve their fortune, through praying for their problems to be solved at a stone in a forest. By praying like this, they rid the person of the Magatsugami feeding on their sadness and therefore causing their misfortune. Normally, the memory of the person with the Magatsugami would be erased so that the identities of the Seven are not revealed, but this does not work for Amano. In episode 10, Amano and her childhood friends Nene and Mimi transform into Lucky Three (three transforming magical girls similar to the Happy Seven) but Mimi and Nene's memories are erased by Kikunosuke.

Characters

Better Fortune Research Organization
Amano Sakogami (voiced by Yuuna Inamura): The protagonist of the story who had been possessed by a Magatsugami from the time when she was very young until she met the Better Fortune Research Organization who used their powers to defeat it. The Magatsugami gave her extremely bad luck, causing things to happen to her ranging from tripping and falling down staircases or stepping on and break her brand-new cell phone to having heavy objects fall on her or getting hit by a volleyball in gym class. After the Magatsugami was defeated, Amano's luck became far better but her clumsiness remained. She has a crush on Kikunosuke, but does not know the rule that the other female members of the club have: even though they all like him, they are not allowed to go out with him. After discovering the secret of the club, she asks to join and is unanimously rejected by all of the female members, but when she offers to be the manager Kikunosuke agrees while all of the others were discussing the idea. She is one of the Lucky Three and the leader.
Kikunosuke Kagawa (voiced by Jun Fukuyama): The only male club member and Amano's upperclassman who she has a crush on. He can transform into one of the Seven, but his god is not readily revealed. When Amano asks for details about the Happy Seven and he is explaining how each member represents a god, he only has the chance to tell her that his role was more complicated than the others. His eyes always appear to be closed except for when he transforms.
Kuriya Kuroda (voiced by Houko Kuwashima): She represents Daikoku-ten and carries a hammer as a weapon. She seems to be some sort of leader among the Happy Seven.
Tamon Kitayama (voiced by Chiemi Chiba): Tamon represents Bishamon-ten, and her power is Jarei-mekkyaku raiko sange. She is one of the Happy Seven that undertake a major personality change after the appearance shift, going from shy, and timid to slightly aggressive and sure of her power.
Sarasugawa Kiku (voiced by Mai Nakahara): Also said as Okiku. She represents Benzai-ten. She is outgoing and cocky about her talents, but she can easily back her boasts up. She constantly calls Amano "Ribbon Girl" and puts on the outside appearance that she doesn't like her.
Mahiru Oki (voiced by Yu Kobayashi): Mahiru represents Ebisu and tends to carry around a fish with her. Even her weapon when she transforms is something like a fishing pole with a fish on the end. She is the only university student in the club.
Miku Munakata (voiced by Yuuko Sumitomo): She represents Hotei-sama and is a doctor. She is the eldest member of the club (she works as the school's nurse) and has the power to predict the future when she transforms and appears to have some minor premonitions when not transformed as seen in Episode 9.
Mina and Nami Kotobuki (voiced by Omi Minami): Mina and Nami are twins and the youngest members of the club, as the only elementary students. They have a tendency to fall over and go to sleep if they expend even the smallest amount of energy, which they seem to lack, except when they transform in which case they are full of energy. Mina represents Fukurokuju and Nami represents Juroujin (twin gods of luck and fortune based on Shou, the god of the South Pole Star in Taoist astrology). Because they represent a binary god, they are almost the same person. Details about the twins' relationship are in episode 6.
Kuan Kitayama (voiced by Eri Sendai): She is one of the few club members who is not a part of the Happy Seven and is Tamon's younger sister. She is shown as being good with computers and machinery, and helps the Happy Seven by using her computer to get information on Magatsugami and using various gizmos to stun, trap, or otherwise hinder them.
Shouko Shouda (voiced by Tomoko Kaneda): Also called Shoujou, she has dog ears and can transform into a small dog. She is one of the members who cannot transform, but acts as a sort of familiar for the others. Every time some one refers to her as a dog, she sharply denies being one, which is often disproved by one of the members issuing a command such as "shake" and her automatically complying.

Enemies
Kokuanten (Voiced by Kikuko Inoue) : An Evil Goddess whose power was some how taken away, her goal is to use the "Red Star" to return herself to full strength, she also has some measure of control over the Magatsugami and "Tainted Ones."
Tomoya Kuki (Voiced by Kumi Sakuma): He is the student council president at the school and appears henchman of sorts to Kokuanten, but is later revealed to be using her for his own end.
Magatsugami: Monsters that possess people and cause misfortune, then feeding on their unhappiness. Kokuanten and Tomoya manipulate them so that they can be used against the Happy Seven, whose job it is to defeat them. When they are killed, they turn into good luck charms.

Supporting Characters
Mimi Masuko (voiced by Nanako Inoue): She is Amano and Nene's childhood friend and a member of Lucky Three representing the Ears, though her memory was erased after she transformed.
Nene Tokuda (voiced by Erika Nakai): Amano and Mimi's childhood friend and a member of Lucky Three representing the Eyes, though she, like Mimi, had her memory of the incident erased.
Chazawa: Teacher who isn't married and dreams of it. But eventually marries one of his former students.
Kaoru Sajime: A student at the school who dressed like a boy because she was possessed by a Magatsugami. The club solved her problem after discovering that her reason for being unhappy was her parents' disapproval of her hobby, which is building models, because it isn't "feminine". After defeating the Magatsugami, her parents saw reason and allowed her to return to the plastic model club, which they had forced her to quit along with her hobby. She is the only girl in that club and the male members have a rule similar to the Better Fortune Research Organization's, which only the male members know about, which is that none of them are allowed to date her.
Tomomi Sasaki (Saki Fujita): Appeared in episode 10. A friend of Mimi's that had a confusing life and didn't believe in anything.

Episode list

Theme songs
 Opening Theme
"Akiramenaide" by Little Non

 Ending Theme
"Funny Girl" by Yuka (Except 9)
"Tomaranai Ame" by Little Non (Episode 9)

References

2001 Japanese novels
2005 Japanese television series debuts
2005 Japanese television series endings
Harem anime and manga
School life in anime and manga
Studio Hibari
Super Dash Bunko
Shueisha franchises
Magical girl anime and manga
Television shows based on light novels
Light novels